|}

The Commonwealth Cup is a Group 1 flat horse race in Great Britain open to colts and fillies aged three years. It is run at Ascot over a distance of 6 furlongs (1,207 metres), and it is scheduled to take place each year in June.

The Commonwealth Cup was introduced in 2015 as part of changes to the programme of sprint horse races in Europe. The Diamond Jubilee Stakes, run over the same course and distance at the same meeting, was closed to three-year-olds at the same time. The new race was subsequently named the Commonwealth Cup and the Buckingham Palace Stakes was removed from the Royal Ascot meeting to make room for the new race. The race was initially open to all three year-old-horses, including geldings, to help the race become established. It was the only Group 1 flat race in Great Britain exclusively for three-year-olds that allowed geldings to compete and the first age-restricted Group 1 race which was open to geldings in Europe. Geldings were excluded after the 2019 running.

Records
Leading jockey (2 wins):
 Frankie Dettori – Advertise (2019), Campanelle (2021)

Winners

See also
 Horse racing in Great Britain
 List of British flat horse races

References

Racing Post:

 ifhaonline.org – International Federation of Horseracing Authorities – Commonwealth Cup (2019).

Flat races in Great Britain
Ascot Racecourse
Flat horse races for three-year-olds
British Champions Series
Recurring sporting events established in 2015
2015 establishments in England